Kimon Digenis (1871–1945) was a Hellenic Army officer who reached the rank of Major General.

He was born in Kimolos, South Aegean in 1871. He enrolled in the Hellenic Military Academy, and graduated in 1891 as a Second Lieutenant of the Artillery. He fought in the Greco-Turkish War of 1897, the Balkan Wars, the Macedonian front of World War I and the Asia Minor Campaign. 

During World War I, after the electoral defeat of the Liberal Party in November 1920, he replaced the Venizelist Colonel Konstantinos Manetas as commander of the 13th Infantry Division and commanded it in the operations of the spring and summer of 1921. In 1922, as Major General, he was in command of the II Army Corps.

Following the Battle of Dumlupınar, he became a prisoner of war in Asia Minor in August 1922 and after a large-scale Army revolt that toppled the royalist government, he was dismissed from the army. 

He died in Athens in 1945.

References 

1871 births
1945 deaths
20th-century Greek people
Hellenic Army major generals
Greek military personnel of the Greco-Turkish War (1919–1922)
Greek prisoners of war
People from Kimolos
Prisoners and detainees of Turkey